Chen Fengqing (born 17 July 1985) is a Chinese goalball player. She won a silver medal at each of the 2008, 2012, and 2016 Summer Paralympics.

Chen's visual impairment was congenital. Before she took on goalball in 2003, Chen was doing farm work in her hometown.

References

Female goalball players
1985 births
Living people
Sportspeople from Yunnan
People from Chengjiang
Paralympic goalball players of China
Paralympic silver medalists for China
Goalball players at the 2008 Summer Paralympics
Goalball players at the 2012 Summer Paralympics
Goalball players at the 2016 Summer Paralympics
Medalists at the 2016 Summer Paralympics
Medalists at the 2008 Summer Paralympics
Medalists at the 2012 Summer Paralympics
Paralympic medalists in goalball
Goalball players at the 2020 Summer Paralympics